Joseph Young Jr. (September 23, 1927 – March 24, 1999), known as Mighty Joe Young, was an American Chicago blues guitarist.

Biography
Young was born in Shreveport, Louisiana, moving to Milwaukee in about 1945. He was an amateur boxer in the 1940s, but he later recalled that "It was nothing to write home about... I decided that music was the best thing to do." He began his music career in the early 1950s, singing on the Milwaukee nightclub circuit and taking his stage name after the film of the same name. In 1955, he returned to Louisiana to make his recording debut, for Jiffy Records.

He then moved to Chicago, where he worked as a sideman, notably with Joe Little & his Heart Breakers and later Billy Boy Arnold.  After recording "Why Baby" / "Empty Arms" for Bobby Robinson's Fire Records in 1961, he performed with Otis Rush in the early 1960s, playing on Rush's album Cold Day in Hell.  He also continued to record under his own name for small labels such as Webcor, Celtex, and Jacklyn.  He played on Magic Sam's albums West Side Soul and Black Magic and also worked with Jimmy Rogers, Willie Dixon, Tyrone Davis and Jimmy Dawkins.

Young's album Blues with a Touch of Soul was released by Delmark Records in 1971, and two further albums followed on the Ovation label in the mid-1970s.

Young regularly performed in the 1970s and 1980s at the Wise Fools Pub in Chicago.  His song "Turning Point" was used in the feature film Thief (1981), directed by Michael Mann.

In 1986 he began work on an album, eventually released in 1997 as Mighty Man.  After he underwent surgery on a pinched nerve in his neck, he developed numbness in his fingers, which affected his ability to play guitar.  In 1998, he underwent further surgery on his spine in an attempt to regain feeling in his fingers, but he died at the age of 71 after developing pneumonia.

Appraisal
Young's mid-1970s Ovation LPs were said by AllMusic's Bill Dahl to have "showcased the guitarist's blues-soul synthesis". Reviewing Young's 1976 self-titled LP in Christgau's Record Guide: Rock Albums of the Seventies (1981), Robert Christgau wrote: "If Young's voice weren't as gruffly workaday as his guitar, he might be a threat—he's got a knack for the blues subject, from mama-in-law to barbecue to what money can buy. Even with the stupid string synthesizer butting in, this is a solid, coverable groove album."

Discography
Blues with a Touch of Soul (Delmark), 1971
Legacy of the Blues, vol. 4 (Sonet), 1972
Chicken Heads (Ovation), 1974
Mighty Joe Young (Ovation), 1976
Bluesy Josephine (Black and Blue), 1976
Love Gone (Ovation), 1978
Live at the Wise Fools Pub (Aim Trading Group), 1978
Mighty Man (Blind Pig), 1997
With Magic Sam
West Side Soul (Delmark, 1967)
Black Magic (Delmark, 1968)
The Magic Sam Legacy (Delmark, 1967/68 [1989])

See also
List of nicknames of blues musicians

References

External links
 Illustrated Mighty Joe Young discography
 Obituaries at Elvispelvis.com
 Mini biography at Elvispelvis.com

1927 births
1999 deaths
Musicians from Shreveport, Louisiana
Chicago blues musicians
American blues guitarists
American blues singers
American male guitarists
Deaths from pneumonia in Illinois
Fire Records artists
Ovation Records artists
Singers from Chicago
Singers from Louisiana
20th-century American guitarists
Guitarists from Chicago
Guitarists from Louisiana
African-American guitarists
20th-century African-American male singers